William Davis Gallagher (August 21, 1808 – June 27, 1894) was an American journalist and poet.

Biography
Davis was born on August 21, 1808, in Philadelphia, Pennsylvania. He later moved with his family to Mount Healthy, Ohio after the death of his father, a refugee from Ireland who had fled after the Irish Rebellion of 1803. He worked as an editor for various newspapers and in later years became famous for poetry. In 1841, Davis compiled Selections from the Poetical Literature of the West, one of the earliest American regional poetry anthologies; it included poems by 38 writers in the West, including Gallagher's own very popular poem, "Miami Woods". His poetry is available in numerous anthologies. He died in 1894.

References

 http://www.answers.com/topic/william-davis-gallagher?cat=entertainment
 Beginnings of Literary Culture in the Ohio Valley, Chapter XV, "William Davis Gallagher: Poet, Editor, and Government Official", pp 436–470, by William Henry Venable, 1891, R. Clarke & Co.

1808 births
1894 deaths
19th-century American poets
American male poets
19th-century American journalists
American male journalists
19th-century American male writers
Writers from Philadelphia
People from Mount Healthy, Ohio